Lenna is a comune (municipality) in the Province of Bergamo in the Italian region of Lombardy, located about  northeast of Milan and about  north of Bergamo.

The municipality of Lenna contains the frazione (subdivision) Scalvino.

Lenna borders the following municipalities: Camerata Cornello, Dossena, Moio de' Calvi, Piazza Brembana, Roncobello, San Giovanni Bianco, Valnegra.

Demographic evolution

References